Patrick DeCoste (born July 22, 1978 in Boston, Massachusetts) is an American rock guitarist.

Biography
Patrick DeCoste (pronounced: "dē-coast") began playing guitar at the age of 13 at a local music store in West Roxbury, MA and then went on to study at the Boston Conservatory of Music's Summer Sessions (1992) & Berklee College of Music's 5 Week Summer Program & Summer Guitar Sessions (1994–1995).  He was also awarded full-tuition scholarships to attend Berklee College of Music's Boston City Music Program (1994–1996).  While at Berklee, he studied under the direction of Tomo Fujita.

Since 2003, DeCoste has performed as an instrumental guitarist, releasing 2 CDs.  His 2003 Advanced Demo CD dominated the MP3.com charts and is credited with establishing his name within the instrumental guitar community.   In 2004, DeCoste released Inside The Unsaid which debuted at #3 alongside Grammy winners Eric Johnson & Steve Morse.  Music from this CD has been featured at major sporting events, such as the now-defunct San Diego Gulls, as well as various radio shows including Q's House and PBS 106.7FM's weekly show: FretNet.  DeCoste is currently endorsed by Ernie Ball Music Man guitars, alongside Steve Lukather, Albert Lee and John Petrucci.

Performance
DeCoste's famed version of the Star Spangled Banner from his 2003 Advanced Demo has been performed live at various major Sports arenas such as Shea Stadium, the Agganis Arena & the DCU Center and can be found on YouTube.

He has recorded/ shared the stage with the following artists:
Gary Hoey (Surdog Records), Johnny A (Favored Nations), Joe Stump (Leviathan Records), Jon Finn (Legato Records), Lori McKenna (Warner Bros. Nashville), Nate Morton (CBS Rockstar: INXS drummer), Ed Toth (Vertical Horizon/ Doobie Bros) & Chris Loftlin (Brian Mcknight Bassist)

Discography
 2003 Advanced Demo CD (2003)
 Love In Misery
 Premonition
 The New Millennium
 Breaking The Silence
 The Star Spangled Banner
 Greasy Fingers (bonus track)

 Inside The Unsaid (2004)
 Above The Beyond
 Breaking The Silence
 The New Millennium
 In Step
 Premonition
 Love In Misery
 Greasy Fingers
 Home
 Floydian Theory

 2008 Advanced EP (release date: 2008)
 Hello World
 Mark Twain
 Saudade
 Love In Misery (alt. version)
 San Jacinto
 Untitled Track (video)

References

External links
Official Website
[ Patrick DeCoste] at AllMusic.com
BostonBeats.com Presents: Lessons With Patrick DeCoste

1978 births
Living people
American rock guitarists
American male guitarists
21st-century American guitarists
21st-century American male musicians